In enzymology, a N-acyl-D-aspartate deacylase is an enzyme that catalyzes the chemical reaction

N-acyl-D-aspartate + H2O  a carboxylate + D-aspartate

Thus, the two substrates of this enzyme are N-acyl-D-aspartate and H2O, whereas its two products are carboxylate and D-aspartate.

This enzyme belongs to the family of hydrolases, those acting on carbon-nitrogen bonds other than peptide bonds, specifically in linear amides.  The systematic name of this enzyme class is N-acyl-D-aspartate amidohydrolase. It employs one cofactor, zinc.

References

 
 

EC 3.5.1
Zinc enzymes
Enzymes of unknown structure